Christopher R. Ballard (born June 24, 1969) is an American football executive who is the general manager for the Indianapolis Colts of the National Football League (NFL). Before joining the Colts, Ballard was an executive for the Kansas City Chiefs, where he most recently served as the Director of Football Operations, was a scout for the Chicago Bears, and served in various coaching roles at Texas A&M University–Kingsville.

Early life 
Ballard was born in Galveston, Texas. Growing up a severe asthmatic in Texas, as well as Wisconsin, Ballard's parents reluctantly let him play football at a young age. He was a star quarterback in high school. Ballard's favorite NFL team was once the Pittsburgh Steelers; his favorite player was Terry Bradshaw.

Ballard attended the University of Wisconsin–Madison and switched his position to wide receiver as a freshman.

Career

Early career 
After college, Ballard became a history teacher for Hitchcock Junior High while also contributing to their football program. After a referral from Hitchcock's head coach, Ballard joined the Texas A&M–Kingsville Javelinas football team coaching wide receivers. He later coached the secondary and defense.

Chicago Bears 
In 2001, Ballard joined the Chicago Bears' scouting department. It was during this time that he declined a job offer to run first-year coach Art Briles' secondary at the University of Houston. Ballard contributed to Chicago's success in the twelve years he was there. In 2012, he received a promotion to director of pro scouting. Ballard would only remain in this position for one season before moving to the Kansas City Chiefs. During his time with the Bears, he was said to be involved with many acquisitions such as Matt Forte, Johnny Knox, Brandon Marshall, and Martellus Bennett.

Kansas City Chiefs 
Prior to the 2013 season, Ballard joined the Kansas City Chiefs as Director of Player Personnel, the position he remained in until the conclusion of the 2014 season in which he received a promotion to become the Director of Football Operations. He remained with the Chiefs until the conclusion of the 2016 regular season. While with the Kansas City Chiefs, Ballard was involved in drafting Pro-Bowlers Travis Kelce, Tyreek Hill, and Marcus Peters.

Indianapolis Colts 
In the midst of the 2016 NFL Playoffs, Ballard was introduced as the new General Manager of the Indianapolis Colts. Ballard was reportedly attracted to the Indianapolis General Manager job following the dismissal of Ryan Grigson because of the local ownership and team history. He immediately began a roster makeover, mostly on the defensive side of the ball. He cut four starters from the prior season. The Colts would have a losing record in Ballard's first season as their GM. Prior to his second season, the Colts fired Head Coach Chuck Pagano. Despite the Colts announcing that they had signed New England Patriots offensive coordinator Josh McDaniels, McDaniels unexpectedly withdrew from the agreement in principle. On February 11, 2018, the Colts announced Frank Reich as their new head coach.

The Colts finished the season with a 10-6 record, and two of Ballard's 2018 draft choices, Quenton Nelson and Shaquille Leonard were named to the AP All-Pro First Team, becoming the first set of rookie teammates to be named First Team All-Pro since 1965 and only the second in NFL history. Additionally, Leonard was named the NFL Defensive Rookie of the Year. Ballard was named the NFL Executive of the Year by the Pro Football Writers of America in 2018. In August 2021, Ballard signed a five-year contract extension with the Colts.

Personal life 
Ballard and his wife, Kristin, have three children and adopted two more in 2012.

References 

Living people
Sportspeople from Wisconsin
1969 births
People from Galveston, Texas
National Football League general managers
Indianapolis Colts executives
Wisconsin Badgers football players
Chicago Bears scouts
Kansas City Chiefs executives
Chicago Bears executives
Texas A&M–Kingsville Javelinas football coaches